Carl Pope may refer to:

 Carl Pope (environmentalist), former executive director of the Sierra Club
 Carl C. Pope (1834–1911), American lawyer, legislator, and jurist
 Carl Robert Pope, African-American artist